Yury Sharkov (born 29 November 1930) is a Soviet alpine skier. He competed in two events at the 1956 Winter Olympics.

References

External links

1930 births
Possibly living people
Soviet male alpine skiers
Olympic alpine skiers of the Soviet Union
Alpine skiers at the 1956 Winter Olympics